"Crowded" is a song by Jeannie Ortega released as the first official single from her 2006 debut album, No Place Like BKLYN. The song was also featured on the soundtrack to the film Stick It. The song also features underground rapper Papoose. The song charted on the Hot 100 and did well on Pop 100 Airplay.

Music video
The music video was shot in a crowded bar. The video featured an appearance from Terror Squad member Remy Martin.

Charts

References

2006 singles
2006 songs
Jeannie Ortega songs
Papoose (rapper) songs
Hollywood Records singles
Song recordings produced by Stargate (record producers)
Songs written by Tor Erik Hermansen
Songs written by Mikkel Storleer Eriksen